Gonca Nahcıvanlı (born Hune 29, 1979) is a Turkish women's handballer, who plays in the Turkish Women's Handball Super League for İzmir Büyükşehir Belediyesi GSK, and the Turkey national team. The -tall sportswoman is line player.

Playing career

Club
Gonca Nahcıvanlı began her handball career in 1994 at the club Raks in her hometown İzmir.

She was with Anadolu Üniversitesi SK (1997–1999 and 2003–2005), Türk Telekom SK (2000–2001), TMO SK (2002–2003), İzmir BB GSK (2008–2011) and Muratpaşa Bld. SK (2012–2013) before she returned to her hometown club İzmir BB GSK in 2013. Between 2005 and 2007, she played two seasons in Macedonia for the Skopje-based team Kometal Gjorče Petrov. She is the captain of the team.

She enjoyed four times league champion titles with TMO SK in 2002–03, with Kometal Gjorče Petrov in 2005–06 and 2006–07 as well as with Muratpaşa Bld. SK in 2011–12.

Nahcıvanlı took part at the Women's EHF Cup Winners' Cup (1997–98, 1998–99 and 2012–13), the Women's EHF Cup (2001–02, 2002–03, 2004–05, 2009–10 and 2010–11), the Women's EHF Champions League (2002–03, 2005–06 and 2006–07) as well as the Women's EHF Challenge Cup (2003–04, 2008–09, 2011–12, 2014–15 and 2015–16).

International
She plays in the Turkey women's national handball team. She was part of the silver medal-winning national team at the 2009 Mediterranean Games held in Pescara, Italy. She played at the 2010 European Women's Handball Championship qualification matches.

Beach handball
She played in the national team, which took part at the 2010 Beach Handball World Championships in Antalya, Turkey. Nahcıvanlı took part at the 2013 European Women's Beach Handball Championship.

Honours

Club
 Turkish Women's Handball Super League
 Winners (4): 2002–03, 2005–06, 2006–07, 2011–12.
 Runner-up (1): 2010–11.

National
 Handball at the Mediterranean Games
 Winner (1): 2009.

References 

1979 births
Sportspeople from İzmir
Turkish female handball players
İzmir Büyükşehir Belediyespor handball players
Muratpaşa Bld. SK (women's handball) players
Turkey women's national handball players
Expatriate handball players
Turkish expatriate sportspeople in North Macedonia
Turkish beach handball players
Living people
Mediterranean Games silver medalists for Turkey
Competitors at the 2005 Mediterranean Games
Competitors at the 2009 Mediterranean Games
Mediterranean Games medalists in handball